Maud Kamatenesi Mugisha, is a Ugandan female Natural Scientist and academic administrator. She is the former Vice Chancellor of Bishop Stuart University (1st May 2014 - 23rd February 2023), a private Chartered institution of Higher Education in Uganda, accredited by the Uganda National Council for Higher Education. 

She is currently serving as the Chairperson University Council at Kampala International University since 1st March 2023.

Background
She was born in Sheema District, Western Uganda, in 1970.

Education
Kamatenesi attended Kasanna Primary School. She later attended Nganwa High School for her O-Level education, between 1984 and 1988. In 1985, she joined Maryhill High School, in Mbarara, for her A-Level studies. In 1993, she was admitted to Makerere University, Uganda's largest and oldest public university. She studied Botany and Zoology, graduating with a Bachelor of Science degree. She studied for the postgraduate Diploma in Education, also from Makerere. Her Master of Science in Environment and Natural Resources Management degree and her Doctor of Philosophy in Medical Ethnobotany and Ethnopharmacology, were both obtained from Makerere University.

Work experience
Soon after writing her final examinations in Botany and Zoology at Makerere in 1996, she was recruited as a Teaching Assistant in the Faculty of Science at the same institution. From 1998 until 2000, she served as Lecturer and Head of Department, Uganda Fisheries Training Institute in Entebbe. She later would serve as the Head of Fisheries Extension Education and Administration, Fisheries Training Institute, Entebbe. From 2010 until 2011, she served as the Deputy Dean, Research and Graduate Studies, in the Faculty of Science, Makerere University. From February 2011 until May 2014, she served as the Dean of the School of Biosciences, College of Natural Sciences at Makerere University. On 2 May 2014, Kamatenesi Mugisha was appointed Vice Chancellor of Bishop Stuart University

Other considerations
Mugisha has over 30 scientific publications to her name. She is married and is the mother of four children. She is a Born-again Christian.

See also
 Makerere University
 Bishop Stuart University
 List of university leaders in Uganda

References

External links
 Choosing Singlehood

Living people
1969 births
Makerere University alumni
People from Sheema District
People from Western Region, Uganda
Ugandan Christians
Vice-chancellors of universities in Uganda
Women botanists
Ankole people
Ugandan women academics
Academic staff of Makerere University
Academic staff of Bishop Stuart University
People educated at Maryhill High School
Fellows of Uganda National Academy of Sciences
21st-century Ugandan women scientists
21st-century Ugandan scientists